The Very Thought of You is a 2009 novel by film producer Rosie Alison. Set on the brink of World War II, the novel centres on eight-year-old Anna Sands, a child relocated to a Yorkshire estate. She is quickly drawn into the lives of the couple who have set up their estate as a school.

Reception
The Guardian found The Very Thought of You "enjoyable enough" although" its presence on the (Orange) longlist is perplexing." The Telegraph called it "elegantly constructed" and "a pleasant, competent book"

It was nominated for the 2010 Orange Prize for Fiction.

References

External links 
 The Very Thought of You by Rosie Alison - Alma Books

2009 British novels
English novels
Novels set during World War II
Novels set in Yorkshire
Fiction set in 1939
2009 debut novels